Diokno is a Filipino surname that originated from the Taal, Batangas area. It was changed to a more Filipino surname from the original Hispanized surname, "Diocno". Ángel Diokno (born c. 1830) is the oldest known patriarch of the immediate family of Gen. Ananías Diokno (son of Ángel). Although the Diokno family members are primarily prevalent in the Philippines, there are significant numbers of people with this surname in the United States, Saudi Arabia, and other countries. Through marriages the Diokno clan is also interrelated with multiple historical figures, such as public servants Justice Francis Garchitorena, Corazon Aquino (sixth cousin twice removed of Jose W. Diokno through the Sumulong clan), and Governor-General Félix Berenguer de Marquina y Fitzgerald, who is the namesake of Marikina.

Family of Ananías Diokno
Because of the Irish ancestry of Berenguer de Marquina coming from the noble Fitzgerald clan, he descends from some Norman French or English, and European nobles such as Saint Begga of Belgium by forty degrees. St. Begga is the great-great grandmother of King Charlemagne and daughter-in-law to St. Arnulf of Metz, France. The great-great grandson of Berenguer de Marquina is Ananías Diokno, who also descends from William Boleyn, who is the grandfather of Elizabeth I of England. Berenguer de Marquina had an illegitimate Chinese mestiza daughter from Cagsawa, Albay who married a Spanish-Mexican public servant surnamed Sauza, whose daughter settled in Taal, Batangas, marrying a member of the Tagalog Noblejas clan. Their daughter María Andrea Noblejas y Sauza (born c. 1834), who descended from Berenguer de Marquina, became part of the Diokno family by marrying Ángel Diokno (born c. 1830). Because of the Fitzgerald clan, the line at least starting Ananías Diokno y Noblejas can trace its roots to nobles, public servants, soldiers, and saints from the first century A.D.

Notable members of the main branch of the Ananías Diokno family include:

 Ananías Diokno, (1860-1922), son of Ángel Diokno, Filipino general and early patriarch of the family
 Ramón Diokno, (1886-1954), son of Ananías, Filipino justice and senator
 Sen. Jose W. Diokno, (1922-1987), third son and seventh child of Ramón Diokno and Leonor Garcia Wright, Filipino nationalist
 Mench Diokno-Escay, (born May 16, 1950), eldest child of Jose, Filipino NGO worker and UP Diliman valedictorian
 Maris Diokno, (born August 1954), fourth child and third daughter of Jose, Filipino national historian
 Ma. Teresa "Maitet" Diokno-Pascual, fifth child and fourth daughter of Jose, national economist from the London School of Economics and Finance Officer of Sa Uma
 Ma. Soccoro Cookie Diokno, sixth child and daughter of Jose, Secretary-General of the Free Legal Assistance Group
 Jose Manuel I. Chel Diokno, (born 1961), third son of Jose, Filipino law school dean
 Pepe Diokno (born 1987), son of Chel, Filipino director

Non-Immediate relatives outside the main branch of Ananías Diokno 
 Marcela Mariño de Agoncillo, wife of Felipe Agoncillo and daughter of Francisco Diokno Mariño, she is called "The Mother of the Philippine Flag," who sewed the original flag of the Philippines, first unfurled at the declaration of Philippine Independence on June 12, 1898, while her Taal ancestral home owned by Francisco Mariño has been converted into a museum in Agoncillo's name. Furthermore, they share another common ancestor (a Galician) named Ricardo Alfonso Sauza y Holguín, making Agoncillo the third cousin once removed of Ananías Diokno, or third cousin four times removed of Chel Diokno. Chel Diokno and Agoncillo share this relation while simultaneously being linked as cousins in a different degree through another common ancestor surnamed Diokno, and are also related through a common ancestor from Batangas surnamed Marasigan.
 Fr. Jose Diokno, (1819), A Filipino secular priest, appointed from 1819 to 1859 as a parish priest. Donated the painting of the Fifteen Mysteries of the Holy Rosary (Our Lady of Loreto), recorded in the book of inventory of the church properties, February 10, 1855.
 Mariano Diokno, Filipino Soldier
 Felisa Punzalan Diokno, secretary to President Emilio Aguinaldo.
 Benjamin Diokno, (born 1948), second cousin (descended from Ángel Diokno) of Jose W. Diokno, Filipino economist and politician of Corazon Aquino, Joseph Estrada, Rodrigo Duterte, and Bongbong Marcos
 Antonio Heredia Noblejas, Commissioner of the Land Registration Authority. Author of "Land Titles and Deeds", and third cousin to Sen. Jose W. Diokno
 Leopoldo Diokno, Filipino soldier and recipient of the Medal of Valor
 Roberto Diokno, (born 1954), Filipino judge in the landmark case Allado v. Diokno, convicted Cong. Romeo Jalosjos

References

Diokno family